Big Brother 2009 may refer to:

Big Brother 2009 (UK)
Big Brother 2009 (Finland)
Celebrity Big Brother 2009 (UK)
Big Brother 11 (U.S.)